Live 2013 EP is the third extended play (EP) by American industrial rock band Nine Inch Nails. It was released on September 10, 2013, exclusively on Spotify.

The EP features live versions of four tracks, recorded during the Twenty Thirteen Tour. It includes three tracks from the band's 2013 album, Hesitation Marks, "Copy of a", "Came Back Haunted", and "Find My Way", along with an alternative live version of "Sanctified", which is from the band's 1989 debut album, Pretty Hate Machine.

Track listing

Personnel
Nine Inch Nails
 Trent Reznor – lead vocals, guitar, keyboards, synthesizers
 Robin Finck – guitar, synthesizers, backing vocals
 Josh Eustis – bass, synthesizers
 Alessandro Cortini – keyboards, synthesizers, guitar, backing vocals
 Ilan Rubin – drums, percussion, cello

Additional personnel
 Michael Patterson – mixing
 Paul Logus – mastering
 Russell Mills – artwork
 Rob Sheridan – design

References

External links
 
 Live 2013 EP on Spotify

2013 EPs
2013 live albums
Live EPs
Nine Inch Nails EPs
Nine Inch Nails live albums
The Null Corporation EPs